Chivay District is one of twenty districts of the province Caylloma in Peru.

Geography 
Other mountains are listed below:

See also 
 Uskallaqta

References

Districts of the Caylloma Province
Districts of the Arequipa Region